Pokémon: Mewtwo Returns, released in Japan as , is a special episode of the Pokémon anime series and a direct sequel to Pokémon: The First Movie (1998). It was first broadcast in Japan on December 30, 2000 and was released on VHS and DVD in Japan on March 21, 2001. It went direct-to-video in Australia on August 17, 2001 then in the United States and Canada on December 4, 2001 and in the UK on February 11, 2002. The events of the specials take place during the fourth season of Pokémon: Johto League Champions.

In the American dubbed version, the DVD (but not the VHS) features a second mini-feature in addition to the movie feature named The Uncut Story of Mewtwo's Origin. This 10-minute segment was originally part of Mewtwo Strikes Backs running length in the Japanese version, but it was cut from the U.S. release of that movie because it was deemed too dark and morose for the film's American "G" rating. The German DVD release also includes the English language track.

The Japanese opening song is "OK！" by Rika Matsumoto. The ending song is "To My Best Best Friend" (ぼくのベストフレンドへ, Boku no Besuto Furendo e) by Hiromi Iwasaki, and the English opening song is "Born to Be a Winner" by David Ralfe.

Plot
Mewtwo, his heart having been softened by the selfless example of the human named Ash Ketchum back in his birthland in the eastern Kanto region, has now traveled to the western region of Johto in search of a location that is unreachable by the prying eyes and harsh judgments of humans for the sake of his band of cloned Pokémon, with whose welfare Mewtwo is solely concerned. He eventually finds the perfect hideaway: a huge mountain named Mt. Quena, surrounded by steep cliffs that are practically impossible to scale, but in its top is a forest and a freshwater lake that makes for a near-utopia for all the Bug Pokémon living there. This is a perfect fit for Mewtwo's band, so thus they settle in the top of Mt. Quena and begin a new, safe life with Mewtwo watching over as their guardian as he feels they cannot belong in the world as they were not born in it (he seems particularly close to the Pikachu and Meowth clones, possibly reflecting how important their templates were in his change of heart).

At the end of the first movie, Mewtwo erased all memory of the events from all those involved. However, due to his not being on New Island at the time, Giovanni has not forgotten about Mewtwo and has been concocting a military plan of assault upon wherever Mewtwo has settled to take the Pokémon back for himself. He at last locates Mewtwo in his new mountain retreat and begins his operation to assault and capture Mewtwo and bend his will to Giovanni's. The Team Rocket combat unit heads towards Mt. Quena.

Ash and his friends and Pikachu, on their Pokémon journey as always, are now passing through the area around Mt. Quena, but complications with the weather and the bus service force them to stay at a cabin at the foot of the mountain, where they would meet the Pokémon naturalists Luna Carson and Cullen Calix and the spunky young girl Domino who works for a Pokémon institute. But then a break-in and attempted thievery of Pikachu by the classic antics of the Team Rocket trio Jessie, James, and Meowth, and soon a series of turbulent events involving a scuffle on a hot air balloon, leads everyone into the airspace of Mt. Quena.

There everyone sees the approaching Combat Unit, and Domino, climbing up into the balloon to confront the trio, revealed herself of being in league with Team Rocket Organization as elite Agent 009 (or, as she calls herself, The Black Tulip). Despite being in the same organisation as Jessie, James and Meowth, she commented to the lower-in-ranks trio of being a bunch of losers before popping their balloon and sending everyone else plummeting onto the mountain while she returns to Giovanni to report on Mewtwo's status. Giovanni's operation to capture Mewtwo begins in earnest, with Ash and his friends and enemies caught up in the core of it.

Giovanni eventually succeeds in capturing Mewtwo with the threat that the other Pokémon clones would be his to capture and experiment if Mewtwo didn't comply. With Ash and the Pokémon Clones in custody, Giovanni's operation is successful, and he immediately capitalizes by ordering the construction of a new Team Rocket base on the mountain.

The characters and all other cloned Pokémon that attempted to protect Mewtwo are then locked away in a prison cell, along with two mother Pokémon attempting to protect their offspring. While in the cell Meowth translates what the other Pokémon are saying: "They're coming... and they're very angry. They're mad at whoever is polluting the lake and they've come to stop them." Domino eventually releases Jessie and James and demotes them to janitorial work for the new base.

Giovanni's greed for new Team Rocket bases becomes his worst mistake; without warning, a swarm of furious Bug Pokémon (that Meowth was referring to) from the mountain sabotages the Team Rocket base that is polluting the freshwater lake, and the ensuing chaos allows Ash and everyone with him to escape and scatter. Ash rushes over to Mewtwo, believing that this is the first time he's seen Mewtwo, and he and Brock try to free Mewtwo from the machines that are suppressing his mind and body, partly as thanks for Mewtwo protecting Pikachu earlier. However, Mewtwo is weak from using what was left of his power and strength to destroy the machines that held him, putting his life force in jeopardy, but Ash carries Mewtwo away from Giovanni's battle while Brock, Misty and the other clones along with the bug Pokémon keep Team Rocket occupied.

Mewtwo asks Ash why he's helping him, to which Ash replies that you don't need a reason to help someone in trouble. Mewtwo reflects that Ash may be one-of-a-kind, but Ash says that everyone is. As they reach the heart of the mountain, Ash throws Mewtwo into a healing spring that restores his power, prompting Mewtwo to finally accept that he is a real Pokémon, as the water affects him just as it affected others. The Pokémon clone rises and uses all his psychic powers to move the lake and the spring underground, and then uses his mind-erasing powers to clear Giovanni's mind of Mewtwo, the clones, and Mt. Quena. Team Rocket are transported away from the mountain, with the exception of Jessie, James and Meowth, who had hidden in a cave during the battle.

Ash, Meowth and various Pokémon convince Mewtwo not to erase their minds as well, because though Mewtwo would mean well to do so to keep knowledge of this natural sanctuary hidden from the destructive tendencies of humanity, Ash assures that he would permanently keep the mountain's secret unrevealed at any rate. Mewtwo agrees and personally thanks Ash for all his help and understanding, and he departs on his own as all the Clone Pokémon leave to lead life as natural Pokémon in the wild, sending Ash and co. in a Pikachu balloon and Jessie, James and Meowth in their Meowth balloon.

As Ash, Misty and Brock were walking through a city, Ash hears Mewtwo's voice say "I will remember you always" (In the Japanese version, he says "I am here", a reference to the title). The narrator concludes the movie with the rumors of a Pokémon who traversed the city at night.

Voice cast

Music
For the international release, the original score composed by Ralph Schuckett, John Loeffler, Shinji Miyazaki, Kenneth Lampl, Wayne Sharpe for Mewtwo Strikes Back was re-used. The music heard when Domino fights the bug Pokémon is the music that was originally used in a scene in Mewtwo Strikes Back, but was replaced with "Brother My Brother" by Blessid Union of Souls.

References

External links

 
 
 

2000 anime films
2000 television films
2000 films
2000s Japanese-language films
2000 television specials
2000s animated television specials
Japanese television specials
Anime television films
Mewtwo Returns
Films directed by Kunihiko Yuyama